Ferdia Walsh-Peelo (born 12 October 1999) is an Irish actor and musician. He made his film debut in the musical Sing Street (2016) and television debut in the History series Vikings (2017–2020). He has since appeared in the films Here Are the Young Men (2020) and CODA (2021).

Early life and education
Walsh-Peelo was born in Ashford, County Wicklow. He received vocal coaching from his mother, soprano Toni Walsh.

Career
Walsh-Peelo began his musical career as a boy soprano at the age of seven, winning many prizes throughout his early years. He was eventually cast in Mozart's Magic Flute aged twelve, which toured Ireland. Walsh-Peelo followed this up with the part of Miles in Britten's Turn of the Screw. In 2012, he appeared on Irish television in the famous Late Late Toy Show singing and playing piano. He was signed by William Morris Endeavor in the US and Independent Talent in the UK in 2015.

Walsh-Peelo made his onscreen acting debut in John Carney's 2016 musical comedy-drama film Sing Street alongside Lucy Boynton. During the film's screening at the Sundance Film Festival, he performed live with his co-star Mark McKenna.

In 2017, Walsh-Peelo began playing Alfred the Great in Vikings, a role he would play for the History series' final two seasons. He also played a young version of Aiden Gillen's character in the television film Dave Allen at Peace and appeared in the 2020 film Here Are the Young Men as Rez.

Walsh-Peelo played Miles, the singing partner and love interest of Ruby (Emilia Jones) in the 2021 Sundance Film Festival hit and Apple TV+ Original film CODA. He and the rest of the CODA cast won the SAG Award for Best Ensemble. Walsh-Peelo starred opposite Clara Rugaard in the British-Spanish World War II drama Love Gets a Room. He played Nick Kent in the biographical miniseries Pistol.

In 2022 the artist is with a band called The Fynches.

Personal life
Walsh-Peelo is an Ambassador for UNICEF Ireland's program Emergency Lessons, aimed at providing education to children who are in emergencies.

Filmography

Film

Television

Awards and nominations

Notes

References

External links

1999 births
Living people
21st-century Irish male singers
Irish male child actors
Irish male film actors
Male actors from County Wicklow
Outstanding Performance by a Cast in a Motion Picture Screen Actors Guild Award winners